Elaphrus mimus is a species of ground beetle in the subfamily Elaphrinae. It was described by Goulet in 1983.

References

Elaphrinae
Beetles described in 1983